Kakodaimonistai (ancient Greek κακοδαιμονισταί, singular κακοδαιμονιστής, worshippers of the evil daemon) was the name of a dining club in ancient Athens. They chose the name to ridicule the gods and Athenian custom. One of the ways in which they did this, was by dining on unlucky days, holidays set apart for fasting, in order to test the gods.

Notes

Greek words and phrases